Dębieniec  is a village in the administrative district of Gmina Radzyń Chełmiński, within Grudziądz County, Kuyavian-Pomeranian Voivodeship, in north-central Poland. In 2011, the total population of the village was 330.

References

Villages in Grudziądz County